Norwood is a village in Peoria County, Illinois, United States. The population was 478 at the 2010 census. Norwood, just outside Peoria, is part of the Peoria, Illinois Metropolitan Statistical Area.

Geography
Norwood is located at  (40.706804, -89.699650).

Demographics

As of the census of 2000, there were 473 people, 176 households, and 140 families residing in the village. The racial makeup of the village was 99.15% White, 0.21% Native American, 0.21% Asian, and 0.42% from two or more races. Hispanic or Latino of any race were 0.42% of the population.

There were 176 households, out of which 26.7% had children under the age of 18 living with them, 67.0% were married couples living together, 9.1% had a female householder with no husband present, and 19.9% were non-families. 18.2% of all households were made up of individuals, and 9.1% had someone living alone who was 65 years of age or older. The average household size was 2.69 and the average family size was 3.01.

In the village, the population was spread out, with 24.3% under the age of 18, 6.8% from 18 to 24, 27.5% from 25 to 44, 25.8% from 45 to 64, and 15.6% who were 65 years of age or older. The median age was 40 years. For every 100 females, there were 91.5 males. For every 100 females age 18 and over, there were 93.5 males.

The median income for a household in the village was $40,156, and the median income for a family was $44,688. Males had a median income of $35,750 versus $20,893 for females. The per capita income for the village was $16,089. About 3.7% of families and 7.5% of the population were below the poverty line, including 15.1% of those under age 18 and none of those age 65 or over.

The village police department was formed in 1956. As of July 2016, the village had begun contracting through the Peoria County Sheriff's Office for police services.

References

Villages in Peoria County, Illinois
Villages in Illinois
Peoria metropolitan area, Illinois